A. maximus  may refer to:
 Aepyornis maximus, an extinct aepyornithid bird species
 Artamus maximus, the Great Woodswallow, a bird species found in Indonesia and Papua New Guinea

See also
 Maximus (disambiguation)